Midkemia Press was an American game company that produced role-playing games and game supplements.

History
Midkemia was originally created as an alternative to the Dungeons & Dragons (D&D) role-playing game. When Raymond E. Feist studied at the University of California, San Diego, he and his friends created a new role-playing game based on their own original world of Midkemia. The original group have since formed a company called Midkemia Press, which has continued publishing campaigns set in Midkemia.

References

External links
Midkemia Press website

 
Role-playing game publishing companies